(Our Lady of Mercy in English, a title of the Virgin Mary) was a Spanish Navy frigate which was sunk by the British off the south coast of Portugal on 5 October 1804 during the Battle of Cape Santa Maria.

Loss 
At the time of the naval action Spain and England were at peace with each other. The Spanish frigate was part of a small flotilla sailing from Montevideo (Uruguay) to Cadiz (Andalusia, Spain), transporting silver, gold, vicuña, cinnamon, and quinoa. The other ships in the flotilla were Medea, Santa Clara, and Fama.

The flotilla was intercepted by a Royal Navy task force, commanded by Graham Moore aboard HMS Indefatigable, and ordered to change course and proceed to a British port for inspection. The Spanish commanding officer, brigadier José de Bustamante y Guerra (1759–1825) objected that the two nations were at peace, declared that they would not comply with the order, and ordered battle quarters, despite being outgunned and outnumbered. A single shot from HMS Amphion, commanded by Samuel Sutton, hit the ship's magazine, causing an explosion that sank the ship.

250 Spanish crewmen were lost, and 51 survivors were rescued from the sea and taken as prisoner. The other three vessels were interned in Britain.

Salvage 

In 2007 the company Odyssey Marine Exploration reported having found, at an undisclosed location, a very rich shipwreck code-named "Black Swan". Odyssey recovered almost 500,000 silver and gold coins from the wreck, and transported them to the United States. Spanish researchers quickly identified the ship found by Odyssey with Mercedes and the Spanish government started a legal battle to halt what they considered was an act of illegal looting.

Peru attempted to claim the treasure as being originally plundered by the Spanish. However, a court case decided that the Spanish government was the rightful successor of interest because at the time of the wreck, Peru was considered a Spanish colony and not a separate legal entity, therefore it had no legal standing to be entitled to the proceeds of the lawsuit.

A U.S. federal court and a panel from the United States Court of Appeals for the Eleventh Circuit upheld the Spanish claim to the contents of the ship; Spain took control of the treasure in February 2012. A very small number of coins and effects recovered from the ship were deposited in Gibraltar, because they showed clear signs coherent with an internal explosion on the ship and thus confirmed Spanish claims to the wreck being that of Nuestra Señora de las Mercedes. They were not returned to Spain until 2013, when a court finally ordered Odyssey Marine to return the missing pieces.

On 2 December 2012 the 14.5 tons cargo of gold and silver coins recovered from the wreck was deposited in the National Museum of Subaquatic Archaeology in Cartagena (Murcia) for cataloging, study and permanent display.

Exhibition 

Spanish Naval Museum along with National Archaeological Museum of Spain showed the recovered treasure in the exhibition "The last trip of the frigate Mercedes. A recovered cultural treasure" («El último viaje de la fragata Mercedes. Un tesoro cultural recuperado») from June to December 2014.

In 2015 the Spanish government commanded an archaeological expedition to study the shipwreck, which proved that Odyssey had damaged the remnants of the ship when extracting coins.

See also 
 Cabo de Santa Maria (Faro)
 List of Spanish sail frigates
 Black Swan Project

References

External links

Frigates of the Spanish Navy
Maritime incidents in 1804
Shipwrecks in the Atlantic Ocean
Treasure from shipwrecks
1786 ships
Naval magazine explosions